49er & 49er FX Oceania Championships are Oceania Championship sailing regattas in the 49er and the 49er FX classes organised by the International 49er Class Association.

Editions

References

49er competitions
49er FX competitions
Oceania championships in sailing
Oceanian championships